Neocoenyra cooksoni is a butterfly in the family Nymphalidae first described by Herbert Druce in 1907. It is found in the Democratic Republic of the Congo, northern Zambia, Angola and north-western Tanzania. The habitat consists of Brachystegia woodland.

References

Satyrini
Butterflies described in 1907